Stars were a short-lived British supergroup that played a small number of live concerts in Cambridge in February 1972. Its members were Syd Barrett on guitar, Twink on drums, and Jack Monck on bass.

Beginnings
After a spell in Morocco, Twink (ex-Pink Fairies) moved to Cambridge and worked with the 'Last Minute Put Together Boogie Band', initially with vocalist/guitarist Bruce Michael Paine (ex-Apple Pie & star of the San Francisco production of 'Hair') and John 'Honk' Lodge (Junior's Eyes, Quiver) playing bass. The Last Minute Put Together Boogie Band, now with ex-Delivery bass player Jack Monck, backed American Blues guitarist Eddie "Guitar" Burns at King's College Cellar on 26 January 1972. Jack's wife Jenny Spires, a friend of Twink's and former girlfriend of Syd Barrett (ex-Pink Floyd), went with Syd down to the gig and he brought his guitar along and jammed with them in the last set. At the "Six Hour Technicolor Dream" at the Cambridge Corn Exchange the next day (27 January), the Last Minute Put Together Boogie Band, with guests Fred Frith and Syd Barrett, played on a bill with Hawkwind and the Pink Fairies. The Boogie Band played five tracks before being joined on stage by Syd for a further three.

Within the next day or two Jenny, Jack & Twink said 'wouldn't it be great to get Syd playing again'. Twink recalled:

This gig was recorded, and while one mastertape was confiscated by EMI in 1985, another copy surfaced in 2005. In June 2010 this tape was offered for auction but failed to reach its reserve price. It was then purchased by the Easy Action label, who also hold the tapes of the Pink Fairies and Hawkwind sets from the same show. Easy Action released the Hawkwind set as an album licensed from EMI Music in 2012, and released the Last Minute Put Together Boogie Band tape as an album entitled Six Hour Technicolor Dream in June 2014.

Performances
All 'Stars' performances contained Barrett-era Pink Floyd songs and tracks from Barrett's 1970 solo albums The Madcap Laughs and Barrett. The posters for the MC5 / Skin Alley gig also billed an appearance from a new line-up of the Last Minute Put Together Boogie Band - Bruce Paine, Rick Fenn, Bill Gray & Gary Luvaglia. Paine went on to join Steamhammer for a tour of Europe in late 1972 before returning to the United States.

Stars roadie and occasional bass player Joly MacFie said:

Hollingworth wrote:

Jack Monck, speaking in 2001, agreed that the gig was below-par:

The Terrapin fanzine was more charitable in its review of what it called Syd's Final Performance (January 1973).

The damage had already been done when Barrett read the Melody Maker review the following week, despite Joly's assertion that the Cambridge Corn Exchange gig with Nektar, two days later, was an improvement - a claim which Twink seemed to back up:

Guitarist Bernie Elliott was the musician recruited for the Syd-less Stars gigs, alternatively recalled as having been at Seymour Hall in London.Oxford,  Essex Uni. At some point during 1972, Twink, Monck, Dan Kelleher (guitar/keyboards) and George Bacon (guitar) completed a recording session at London's Polydor Studios, with one song later surfacing on a 1991 compilation album. In late 1972, Monck started a new band called Rocks Off with Rusty Burnhill.

Aftermath
Shortly thereafter Syd Barrett left music and his public life altogether and began living in seclusion, but not before Syd performed with Jack Bruce in Cambridge during the Summer of 1973. A night of poetry and music was arranged by Bruce and his writing partner Pete Brown, and when Brown arrived at the gig (having been delayed) he found Bruce jamming with local musicians, one of whom he recalled was playing acoustic jazz guitar. When Brown started his poetry reading, he dedicated one to Syd Barrett, stating that he started the Psychedelic movement in England—only to then see the man with the guitar stand up and say, "No I didn't." Brown only then realized this was Barrett himself. This appears to be the last time he ever performed in public.

Recordings of Stars performances were made but remain lost. American photographer Victor Kraft is known to have recorded (and photographed) the Dandelion gigs, but after his death in 1976 his possessions were removed from his flat by his Cambridge landlord. As mentioned above, the concert with Nektar was recorded but the tapes were lost, although the Boogie Band show with Hawkwind and the Pink Fairies still exists, and a recording of the Eddie "Guitar" Burns gig is also rumoured to have survived. Twink also claimed that Syd had recorded all of their rehearsals on cassette and kept the tapes, but their fate is unknown. Roy Hollingworth, told of the cause of Stars' breakup several years later, was deeply upset, "It was never my intention to harm Syd because I was his biggest fan. He was one of my heroes. I wrote about what I saw and heard as sensitively as I could and it certainly wasn't meant to be a big put down. A little piece of me died that night too. But on a personal level if it hurt Syd I'm very sorry. Ideally, I'd have loved it if he had made a great comeback and gone on and on and on."

Known 'Stars' appearances
 Saturday 29 January 1972 – The Dandelion Coffee Bar, Cambridge
 Saturday 5 February 1972 – The Dandelion Coffee Bar, Cambridge
 Saturday 12 February 1972 – Petty Cury (near the Market Square), Cambridge
 February 1972 – The Dandelion Coffee Bar, Cambridge
 Thursday 24 February 1972 – The Corn Exchange, Cambridge (with MC5 & Skin Alley)
 Saturday 26 February 1972 – The Corn Exchange, Cambridge (with Nektar)

References

External links
 'Poster' for the Cambridge Corn Exchange concerts

English rock music groups
Musical groups established in 1972
Musical groups disestablished in 1972
Musical groups from Cambridge
Syd Barrett
Lost musical works